EQN may refer to:
 Eqn., a mathematical abbreviation for the word "equation"
 eqn (software), an equation typesetting program
 Equiniti, a British outsourcing business
 EverQuest Next, a cancelled video game

See also 
 Equation (disambiguation)